The 1981 Benson and Hedges Open was a men's professional tennis tournament held at the Stanley Street Tennis Stadium in Auckland, New Zealand which was part of the 1981 Grand Prix circuit. It was the 14th edition of the tournament and was held from 5 January through 11 January 1981. First-seeded Bill Scanlon won the singles title.

Finals

Singles

 Bill Scanlon defeated  Tim Wilkison 6–7, 6–3, 3–6, 7–6, 6–0
 It was Scanlon's 1st title of the year and the 4th of his career.

Doubles
 Ferdi Taygan /  Tim Wilkison defeated  Tony Graham /  Bill Scanlon 7–5, 6–1
 It was Taygan's 1st title of the year and the 5th of his career. It was Wilkison's 1st title of the year and the 4th of his career.

References

External links
 ATP – tournament profile
 ITF – tournament edition details

Heineken Open
Heineken Open
ATP Auckland Open
January 1981 sports events in New Zealand